Chicoreus dunni is a species of sea snail, a marine gastropod mollusk in the family Muricidae, the murex snails or rock snails.

Description
Original description: "Shell small for genus, slender, elongated, with elevated spire and long siphonal canal; body whorl with 3 varices; intervarical regions with 1 large rounded knob, varices with 6 highly fimbriated, long, slender, recurved spines; siphonal varices with 3 very elongated, slender, recurved, needle-like spines; body whorl with 6 highly fimbriated spiral cords; aperture large, oval; shell color uniformly very dark blackish-brown; edge of parietal shield orange; interior of aperture brown; spines of siphonal canal always longer than spines on varices."

Distribution
Locus typicus: "South-Eastern end of Eleuthera Island, Bahamas."

References

Muricidae
Gastropods described in 1987